
Ottendorf  may refer to:

People
 Nicholas Dietrich, Baron de Ottendorf

Places

Austria
Ottendorf an der Rittschein, in Styria

Germany
Ottendorf-Okrilla, in the district of Bautzen, Saxony
Ottendorf, Schleswig-Holstein, in the Rendsburg-Eckernförde district, Schleswig-Holstein
Ottendorf, Thuringia, in the Saale-Holzland-Kreis district, Thuringia
Ottendorf (Sebnitz), a village in the municipality of Sebnitz, Sächsische Schweiz-Osterzgebirge district, Saxony
A part of Bahretal in the Sächsische Schweiz-Osterzgebirge district, Saxony